The Union of Railroad Workers of the Mexican Republic (or STFRM) is labor union that represents railroad workers in Mexico. It was founded in 1933. It became affiliated with the Confederation of Mexican Workers (CTM)in 1936. It is enrolled in the PRI.

Trade unions in Mexico
Trade unions established in 1933